Valentine Loewi Davies (August 25, 1905 – July 23, 1961) was an American film and television writer, producer, and director. His film credits included Miracle on 34th Street (1947), Chicken Every Sunday (1949), It Happens Every Spring (1949), The Bridges at Toko-Ri (1954), and The Benny Goodman Story (1955). He won the 1947 Academy Award for Best Story for Miracle on 34th Street and was nominated for the 1954 Academy Award for Best Original Screenplay for The Glenn Miller Story.

Biography
Davies was born in New York City, served in the Coast Guard, and graduated from the University of Michigan where he developed his writing skill with a column in the Michigan Daily and honed his skills further as a graduate student at Yale Drama School. He walked away from his family's successful real estate business in New York  and moved to Hollywood to become a screenwriter. He wrote a number of Broadway plays and was president of the Screen Writers Guild and general chairman of the Academy Awards program.

He wrote the story for the 1947 film Miracle on 34th Street, which was given screen treatment by the director, George Seaton. Davies also did a novelization of the story, which was published as a novella by Harcourt Brace & Company in conjunction with the film release. Miracle on 34th Street earned him an Academy Award for Best Story.

From 1949 to 1950, he served as President of the Screen Writers Guild.  He died in 1961 at his home in Malibu, California when he was fifty-five years old.  His secretary at the time of his death, Marian Saphro, recalled many years later that her boss died in the midst of a heavy laugh. The Valentine Davies Award was established in 1962, the year following his death, by the Writers Guild of America, West, in his honor. It has been awarded annually, excepting the years 2006, 2010, and 2015.

External links
 Valentine Davies Biography
 

American film directors
American male screenwriters
Presidents of the Academy of Motion Picture Arts and Sciences
1905 births
1961 deaths
University of Michigan alumni
Best Story Academy Award winners
The Michigan Daily alumni
20th-century American male writers
20th-century American screenwriters